Old Chinese, also called Archaic Chinese in older works, is the oldest attested stage of Chinese, and the ancestor of all modern varieties of Chinese. The earliest examples of Chinese are divinatory inscriptions on oracle bones from around 1250 BC, in the late Shang dynasty. Bronze inscriptions became plentiful during the following Zhou dynasty. The latter part of the Zhou period saw a flowering of literature, including classical works such as the Analects, the Mencius, and the Zuo zhuan. These works served as models for Literary Chinese (or Classical Chinese), which remained the written standard until the early twentieth century, thus preserving the vocabulary and grammar of late Old Chinese.

Old Chinese was written with several early forms of Chinese characters, including Oracle Bone, Bronze, and Seal scripts. Throughout the Old Chinese period, there was a close correspondence between a character and a monosyllabic and monomorphemic word. Although the script is not alphabetic, the majority of characters were created based on phonetic considerations. At first, words that were difficult to represent visually were written using a "borrowed" character for a similar-sounding word (rebus principle). Later on, to reduce ambiguity, new characters were created for these phonetic borrowings by appending a radical that conveys a broad semantic category, resulting in compound xingsheng (phono-semantic) characters. For the earliest attested stage of Old Chinese of the late Shang dynasty, the phonetic information implicit in these xingsheng characters which are grouped into phonetic series, known as the xiesheng series, represents the only direct source of phonological data for reconstructing the language. The corpus of xingsheng characters was greatly expanded in the following Zhou dynasty. In addition, the rhymes of the earliest recorded poems, primarily those of the Shijing, provide an extensive source of phonological information with respect to syllable finals for the Central Plains dialects during the Western Zhou and Spring and Autumn periods. Similarly, the Chuci provides rhyme data for the dialect spoken in the Chu region during the Warring States period. These rhymes, together with clues from the phonetic components of xingsheng characters, allow most characters attested in Old Chinese to be assigned to one of 30 or 31 rhyme groups. For late Old Chinese of the Han period, the modern Southern Min dialects, the oldest layer of Sino-Vietnamese vocabulary, and a few early transliterations of foreign proper names, as well as names for non-native flora and fauna, also provide insights into language reconstruction.

Although many of the finer details remain unclear, most scholars agree that Old Chinese differed from Middle Chinese in lacking retroflex and palatal obstruents but having initial consonant clusters of some sort, and in having voiceless nasals and liquids. Most recent reconstructions also describe Old Chinese as a language without tones, but having consonant clusters at the end of the syllable, which developed into tone distinctions in Middle Chinese.

Most researchers trace the core vocabulary of Old Chinese to Sino-Tibetan, with much early borrowing from neighbouring languages.
During the Zhou period, the originally monosyllabic vocabulary was augmented with polysyllabic words formed by compounding and reduplication, although monosyllabic vocabulary was still predominant. Unlike Middle Chinese and the modern Chinese dialects, Old Chinese had a significant amount of derivational morphology. Several affixes have been identified, including ones for the verbification of nouns, conversion between transitive and intransitive verbs, and formation of causative verbs. Like modern Chinese, it appears to be uninflected, though a pronoun case and number system seems to have existed during the Shang and early Zhou but was already in the process of disappearing by the Classical period. Likewise, by the Classical period, most morphological derivations had become unproductive or vestigial, and grammatical relationships were primarily indicated using word order and grammatical particles.

Classification 
Middle Chinese and its southern neighbours Kra–Dai, Hmong–Mien and the Vietic branch of Austroasiatic have similar tone systems, syllable structure, grammatical features and lack of inflection, but these are believed to be areal features spread by diffusion rather than indicating common descent.
The most widely accepted hypothesis is that Chinese belongs to the Sino-Tibetan language family, together with Burmese, Tibetan and many other languages spoken in the Himalayas and the Southeast Asian Massif.
The evidence consists of some hundreds of proposed cognate words, including such basic vocabulary as the following:

Although the relationship was first proposed in the early 19th century and is now broadly accepted, reconstruction of Sino-Tibetan is much less developed than that of families such as Indo-European or Austronesian.
Although Old Chinese is by far the earliest attested member of the family, its logographic script does not clearly indicate the pronunciation of words.
Other difficulties have included the great diversity of the languages, the lack of inflection in many of them, and the effects of language contact.
In addition, many of the smaller languages are poorly described because they are spoken in mountainous areas that are difficult to reach, including several sensitive border zones.

Initial consonants generally correspond regarding place and manner of articulation, but voicing and aspiration are much less regular, and prefixal elements vary widely between languages. Some researchers believe that both these phenomena reflect lost minor syllables. Proto-Tibeto-Burman as reconstructed by Benedict and Matisoff lacks an aspiration distinction on initial stops and affricates. Aspiration in Old Chinese often corresponds to pre-initial consonants in Tibetan and Lolo-Burmese, and is believed to be a Chinese innovation arising from earlier prefixes.

History 

The earliest known written records of the Chinese language were found at the Yinxu site near modern Anyang identified as the last capital of the Shang dynasty, and date from about 1250 BC. These are the oracle bones, short inscriptions carved on tortoise plastrons and ox scapulae for divinatory purposes, as well as a few brief bronze inscriptions. The language written is undoubtedly an early form of Chinese, but is difficult to interpret due to the limited subject matter and high proportion of proper names. Only half of the 4,000 characters used have been identified with certainty. Little is known about the grammar of this language, but it seems much less reliant on grammatical particles than Classical Chinese.

From early in the Western Zhou period, around 1000 BC, the most important recovered texts are bronze inscriptions, many of considerable length. Even longer pre-Classical texts on a wide range of subjects have also been transmitted through the literary tradition. The oldest sections of the Book of Documents, the Classic of Poetry and the I Ching, also date from the early Zhou period, and closely resemble the bronze inscriptions in vocabulary, syntax, and style. A greater proportion of this more varied vocabulary has been identified than for the oracular period.

The four centuries preceding the unification of China in 221 BC (the later Spring and Autumn period and the Warring States period) constitute the Chinese classical period in the strict sense, although some authors also include the subsequent Qin and Han dynasties, thus encompassing the next four centuries of the early imperial period. There are many bronze inscriptions from this period, but they are vastly outweighed by a rich literature written in ink on bamboo and wooden slips and (toward the end of the period) silk and paper. Although these are perishable materials, and many books were destroyed in the burning of books and burying of scholars in the Qin dynasty, a significant number of texts were transmitted as copies, and a few of these survived to the present day as the received classics. Works from this period, including the Analects, the Mencius, the Tao Te Ching, the Commentary of Zuo, the Guoyu, and the early Han Records of the Grand Historian, have been admired as models of prose style by later generations.

During the Han dynasty, disyllabic words proliferated in the spoken language and gradually replaced the mainly monosyllabic vocabulary of the pre-Qin period, while grammatically, noun classifiers became a prominent feature of the language. While some of these innovations were reflected in the writings of Han dynasty authors (e.g., Sima Qian), later writers increasingly imitated earlier, pre-Qin literary models. As a result, the syntax and vocabulary of pre-Qin Classical Chinese was preserved in the form of Literary Chinese (wenyan), a written standard which served as a lingua franca for formal writing in China and neighboring Sinosphere countries until the late nineteenth and early twentieth centuries.

Script

Each character of the script represented a single Old Chinese word. Most scholars believe that these words were monosyllabic, though some have recently suggested that a minority of them had minor presyllables. The development of these characters follows the same three stages that characterized Egyptian hieroglyphs, Mesopotamian cuneiform script and the Maya script.

Some words could be represented by pictures (later stylized) such as   'sun',   'person' and   'tree, wood', by abstract symbols such as   'three' and   'up', or by composite symbols such as   'forest' (two trees).
About 1,000 of the oracle bone characters, nearly a quarter of the total, are of this type, though 300 of them have not yet been deciphered.
Though the pictographic origins of these characters are apparent, they have already undergone extensive simplification and conventionalization.
Evolved forms of most of these characters are still in common use today.

Next, words that could not be represented pictorially, such as abstract terms and grammatical particles, were signified by borrowing characters of pictorial origin representing similar-sounding words (the "rebus strategy"):
 The word  'tremble' was originally written with the character  for  'chestnut'.
 The pronoun and modal particle  was written with the character  originally representing  'winnowing basket'.
Sometimes the borrowed character would be modified slightly to distinguish it from the original, as with   'don't', a borrowing of   'mother'.
Later, phonetic loans were systematically disambiguated by the addition of semantic indicators, usually to the less common word:
 The word  'tremble' was later written with the character , formed by adding the symbol , a variant of   'heart'.
 The less common original word  'winnowing basket' came to be written with the compound , obtained by adding the symbol   'bamboo' to the character.
Such phono-semantic compound characters were already used extensively on the oracle bones, and the vast majority of characters created since then have been of this type.
In the Shuowen Jiezi, a dictionary compiled in the 2nd century, 82% of the 9,353 characters are classified as phono-semantic compounds.
In the light of the modern understanding of Old Chinese phonology, researchers now believe that most of the characters originally classified as semantic compounds also have a phonetic nature.

These developments were already present in the oracle bone script, possibly implying a significant period of development prior to the extant inscriptions.
This may have involved writing on perishable materials, as suggested by the appearance on oracle bones of the character   'records'.
The character is thought to depict bamboo or wooden strips tied together with leather thongs, a writing material known from later archaeological finds.

Development and simplification of the script continued during the pre-Classical and Classical periods, with characters becoming less pictorial and more linear and regular, with rounded strokes being replaced by sharp angles.
The language developed compound words, so that characters came to represent morphemes, though almost all morphemes could be used as independent words.
Hundreds of morphemes of two or more syllables also entered the language, and were written with one phono-semantic compound character per syllable.
During the Warring States period, writing became more widespread, with further simplification and variation, particularly in the eastern states.
The most conservative script prevailed in the western state of Qin, which would later impose its standard on the whole of China.

Phonology

Old Chinese phonology has been reconstructed using a variety of evidence, including the phonetic components of Chinese characters, rhyming practice in the Classic of Poetry and Middle Chinese reading pronunciations described in such works as the Qieyun, a rhyme dictionary published in 601 AD.
Although many details are still disputed, recent formulations are in substantial agreement on the core issues.
For example, the Old Chinese initial consonants recognized by Li Fang-Kuei and William Baxter are given below, with Baxter's (mostly tentative) additions given in parentheses:

Bernhard Karlgren and many later scholars posited the medials ,  and the combination  to explain the retroflex and palatal obstruents of Middle Chinese, as well as many of its vowel contrasts.
 is generally accepted.

Reconstructions since the 1980s usually propose six vowels:

Some scholars also allow for a labiovelar coda .

Grammar

Little is known of the grammar of the language of the Oracular and pre-Classical periods, as the texts are often of a ritual or formulaic nature, and much of their vocabulary has not been deciphered. In contrast, the rich literature of the Warring States period has been extensively analysed. Having no inflection, Old Chinese was heavily reliant on word order, grammatical particles, and inherent word classes.

Word classes 
Classifying Old Chinese words is not always straightforward, as words were not marked for function, word classes overlapped, and words of one class could sometimes be used in roles normally reserved for a different class. The task is more difficult with written texts than it would have been for speakers of Old Chinese, because the derivational morphology is often hidden by the writing system. For example, the verb  'to block' and the derived noun  'frontier' were both written with the same character .

Personal pronouns exhibit a wide variety of forms in Old Chinese texts, possibly due to dialectal variation.
There were two groups of first-person pronouns:
   and  

In the oracle bone inscriptions, the  pronouns were used by the king to refer to himself, and the  forms for the Shang people as a whole.
This distinction is largely absent in later texts, and the  forms disappeared during the classical period.
In the post-Han period,  came to be used as the general first-person pronoun.

The forms  and  continued to be used interchangeably until their replacement by the northwestern variant  (modern Mandarin nǐ) in the Tang period.

Case distinctions were particularly marked among third-person pronouns.
There was no third-person subject pronoun, but  , originally a distal demonstrative, came to be used as a third-person object pronoun in the classical period.
In the post-Han period,  came to be used as the general third-person pronoun.
It survives in some Wu dialects, but has been replaced by a variety of forms elsewhere.

There were demonstrative and interrogative pronouns, but no indefinite pronouns with the meanings 'something' or 'nothing'.
The distributive pronouns were formed with a  suffix:
   'which one' from   'who'
   'each one' from   'all'
   'someone' from   'there is'
   'no-one' from   'there is no'

As in the modern language, localizers (compass directions, 'above', 'inside' and the like) could be placed after nouns to indicate relative positions.
They could also precede verbs to indicate the direction of the action. Nouns denoting times were another special class (time words); they usually preceded the subject to specify the time of an action. However the classifiers so characteristic of Modern Chinese only became common in the Han period and the subsequent Northern and Southern dynasties.

Old Chinese verbs, like their modern counterparts, did not show tense or aspect; these could be indicated with adverbs or particles if required. Verbs could be transitive or intransitive. As in the modern language, adjectives were a special kind of intransitive verb, and a few transitive verbs could also function as modal auxiliaries or as prepositions.

Adverbs described the scope of a statement or various temporal relationships. Modern northern varieties derive the usual negative from the first family, while southern varieties preserve the second. The language had no adverbs of degree until late in the Classical period.

Particles were function words serving a range of purposes. As in the modern language, there were sentence-final particles marking imperatives and yes/no questions.
Conjunctions could join nouns or clauses.

Sentence structure 
As with English and modern Chinese, Old Chinese sentences can be analysed as a subject (a noun phrase, sometimes understood) followed by a predicate, which could be of either nominal or verbal type.

Before the Classical period, nominal predicates consisted of a copular particle   followed by a noun phrase:

The copular verb  of Literary and Modern Chinese dates from the Han period.
In Old Chinese the word was a near demonstrative ('this').

As in Modern Chinese, but unlike most Tibeto-Burman languages, the basic word order in a verbal sentence was subject–verb–object:

Besides inversions for emphasis, there were two exceptions to this rule: a pronoun object of a negated sentence or an interrogative pronoun object would be placed before the verb:

An additional noun phrase could be placed before the subject to serve as the topic. As in the modern language, yes/no questions were formed by adding a sentence-final particle, and requests for information by substituting an interrogative pronoun for the requested element.

Modification 
In general, Old Chinese modifiers preceded the words they modified. Thus relative clauses were placed before the noun, usually marked by the particle   (in a role similar to Modern Chinese de ):

A common instance of this construction was adjectival modification, since the Old Chinese adjective was a type of verb (as in the modern language), but  was usually omitted after monosyllabic adjectives.

Similarly, adverbial modifiers, including various forms of negation, usually occurred before the verb. As in the modern language, time adjuncts occurred either at the start of the sentence or before the verb, depending on their scope, while duration adjuncts were placed after the verb. Instrumental and place adjuncts were usually placed after the verb phrase. These later moved to a position before the verb, as in the modern language.

Vocabulary 
The improved understanding of Old Chinese phonology has enabled the study of the origins of Chinese words (rather than the characters with which they are written).
Most researchers trace the core vocabulary to a Sino-Tibetan ancestor language, with much early borrowing from other neighbouring languages.
The traditional view was that Old Chinese was an isolating language, lacking both inflection and derivation, but it has become clear that words could be formed by derivational affixation, reduplication and compounding.
Most authors consider only monosyllabic roots, but Baxter and Laurent Sagart also propose disyllabic roots in which the first syllable is reduced, as in modern Khmer.

Loanwords 
During the Old Chinese period, Chinese civilization expanded from a compact area around the lower Wei River and middle Yellow River eastwards across the North China Plain to Shandong and then south into the valley of the Yangtze. There are no records of the non-Chinese languages formerly spoken in those areas and subsequently displaced by the Chinese expansion.
However they are believed to have contributed to the vocabulary of Old Chinese, and may be the source of some of the many Chinese words whose origins are still unknown.

Jerry Norman and Mei Tsu-lin have identified early Austroasiatic loanwords in Old Chinese, possibly from the peoples of the lower Yangtze basin known to ancient Chinese as the Yue. For example, the early Chinese name  for the Yangtze was later extended to a general word for 'river' in south China.
Norman and Mei suggest that the word is cognate with Vietnamese  (from *krong) and Mon kruŋ 'river'.

Haudricourt and Strecker have proposed a number of borrowings from the Hmong–Mien languages. These include terms related to rice cultivation, which began in the middle Yangtze valley:
  'rice seedling' from proto-Hmong–Mien 
  'unhulled rice' from proto-Hmong–Mien A
Other words are believed to have been borrowed from languages to the south of the Chinese area, but it is not clear which was the original source, e.g.
  'elephant' can be compared with Mon coiŋ, proto-Tai  and Burmese chaŋ.
  'chicken' versus proto-Tai , proto-Hmong–Mien  and proto-Viet–Muong *r-ka.

In ancient times, the Tarim Basin was occupied by speakers of Indo-European Tocharian languages, the source of  'honey', from proto-Tocharian *ḿət(ə) (where *ḿ is palatalized; cf. Tocharian B mit), cognate with English .
The northern neighbours of Chinese contributed such words as  'calf' – compare Mongolian tuɣul and Manchu tuqšan.

Affixation 
Chinese philologists have long noted words with related meanings and similar pronunciations, sometimes written using the same character.
Henri Maspero attributed some of these alternations to consonant clusters resulting from derivational affixes.
Subsequent work has identified several such affixes, some of which appear to have cognates in other Sino-Tibetan languages.

A common case is "derivation by tone change", in which words in the departing tone appear to be derived from words in other tones.
If Haudricourt's theory of the origin of the departing tone is accepted, these tonal derivations can be interpreted as the result of a derivational suffix .
As Tibetan has a similar suffix, it may be inherited from Sino-Tibetan.
Examples include:
  'to exhaust' and  'exhausted, consumed, ash'
  'to tie' and  'hair-knot'
  'to bring in' and  <  'inside'
  'to weave' and  'silk cloth' (compare Written Tibetan ʼthag 'to weave' and thags 'woven, cloth')
Another alternation involves transitive verbs with an unvoiced initial and passive or stative verbs with a voiced initial:
  'to see' and  'to appear'
  'to mix' and  'mixed, confused'
  'to stretch' and  'long'
Some scholars hold that the transitive verbs with voiceless initials are basic and the voiced initials reflect a de-transitivizing nasal prefix.
Others suggest that the transitive verbs were derived by the addition of a causative prefix  to a stative verb, causing devoicing of the following voiced initial.
Both postulated prefixes have parallels in other Sino-Tibetan languages, in some of which they are still productive.
Several other affixes have been proposed.

Reduplication and compounding 
Old Chinese morphemes were originally monosyllabic, but during the Western Zhou period many new disyllabic words entered the language.
For example, over 30% of the vocabulary of the Mencius is polysyllabic, including 9% proper names, though monosyllabic words occur more frequently, accounting for 80–90% of the text.
Many disyllabic, monomorphemic words, particularly names of insects, birds and plants, and expressive adjectives and adverbs, were formed by varieties of reduplication ( /):
 full reduplication (  'repeated words'), in which the syllable is repeated, as in  'tall and grand' and  'happy and at ease'.
 rhyming semi-reduplication (  'repeated rhymes'), in which only the final is repeated, as in  'elegant, beautiful' and  'oriole'.
 alliterative semi-reduplication (  'paired initials'), in which the initial is repeated, as in  'irregular, uneven' and  'mandarin duck'.

Other disyllabic morphemes include the famous  'butterfly' from the Zhuangzi.
More words, especially nouns, were formed by compounding, including:
 qualification of one noun by another (placed in front), as in  'quince' (literally 'tree-melon'), and  'noon' (literally 'middle-day').
 verb–object compounds, as in  'master of the household' (literally 'manage-horse'), and  'scribe' (literally 'make-writing').
However the components of compounds were not bound morphemes: they could still be used separately.

A number of bimorphemic syllables appeared in the Classical period, resulting from the fusion of words with following unstressed particles or pronouns.

Notes

References

Citations

Works cited 

 
 
 
 
 
 
 
 
 
 
 
 
 
 
 
 
 
 
 
 
 
 
 
 
 
 
 
  (English translation of Wénzìxué Gàiyào , Shangwu, 1988.)

Further reading

External links

  (review of )
 
 
 
 
 
 
  (review of )
  (review of )
Recent Advances in Old Chinese Historical Phonology

 
Subject–verb–object languages
Languages attested from the 13th century BC